Adel Younis (died 25 April 1976) was an Egyptian jurist. He headed the parquet in Alexandria and served as the deputy head justice of the Court of Cessation in Cairo. Then he was named as the head of the Supreme Court of Appeal in Cairo. In 1969 Younis was removed from the office by President Gamal Abdel Nasser together with other 200 judges due to their alleged apposition to the regime. In 1975 Younis was named the minister of justice. He died on 25 April 1976 while serving in the post. Ahmed Talat succeeded him as minister of justice on 2 May.

References

20th-century Egyptian judges
1976 deaths
Judges from Cairo
Justice ministers of Egypt